Limited Collectors' Edition is an American comic book series published by DC Comics from 1972 to 1978. It usually featured reprints of previously published stories but a few issues contained new material. The series was published in an oversized 10" x 14" tabloid (or "treasury") format.

Publication history 
Limited Collectors' Edition was launched with a collection of Rudolph the Red-Nosed Reindeer stories which went on sale October 24, 1972.  DC Comics vice president Sol Harrison had suggested the format stating that "we could create a tabloid size comic that would stand out on the newsstand". Limited Collectors' Edition shared its numbering with two other treasury format series, Famous First Edition and All-New Collectors' Edition. The final issues of the latter two series were tie-ins to the release of Superman: The Movie. DC later published treasuries as part of DC Special Series in 1981 and as a number of one-shots from 1999 to 2003 primarily produced by Paul Dini and Alex Ross.

In 2020, DC put out a new Famous First Edition, C-63, which reprinted in hardcover the first issue of New Fun Comics, which launched the company that became DC.

The issues 

Several planned features for Limited Collectors' Edition were never published. These include several projects by writer/artist Sheldon Mayer. Mayer had been working on an adaptation of The Wizard of Oz but DC's then-Publisher Carmine Infantino canceled the project upon learning of a similar adaptation by Marvel Comics. The two companies published the project jointly and the adaptation was crafted by Marvel's Roy Thomas and John Buscema instead. Mayer also worked on a followup to "The Bible" issue of Limited Collectors' Edition titled "The Story of Jesus" as well as "Rudolph's Easter Parade", an Easter-themed Rudolph the Red-Nosed Reindeer issue. Neither project was published. "The Legend of King Arthur" by writer Gerry Conway and artist Nestor Redondo was a four-issue storyline which was advertised as "Coming Soon" in DC comic books dated September 1975, but the series was never published. A second volume of "The Best of DC" would have included stories reprinted from The Brave and the Bold #42; All-Star Western #11; Superman #247; and Green Lantern #75 but was canceled as part of the DC Implosion.

Famous First Edition 

Famous First Edition was a series of oversized reprints of original Golden Age comics. All but two (#F–7, All-Star Comics #3 and #F–8, Flash Comics #1) included full-size glossy cover-stock reprints of the front and back covers in addition to the usual cardstock outer covers. Famous First Edition reprinted the comics in their entirety, including any paid advertising and other features that appeared in the original. Several issues of Famous First Edition were also published in hardcover editions by Lyle Stuart, Inc. The Grand Comics Database only lists hardcover versions for issues #C–26 (Action Comics #1), #C–28 (Detective Comics #27), #C–30 (Sensation Comics #1), #F–4 (Whiz Comics #2), and #F–6 (Wonder Woman #1) while the Overstreet Comic Book Price Guide includes a listing for a hardcover version of #F–5 (Batman #1) with a notation of "exists?" The reprint of New Fun #1 published in 2020 was released in a hardcover edition only.

All-New Collectors' Edition 

Three features originally intended for All-New Collectors' Edition were published elsewhere due to the title's cancellation as part of the DC Implosion. "Superman's Life Story" by Martin Pasko and Curt Swan was published in Action Comics #500 (October 1979). The planned 1978 Rudolph the Red-Nosed Reindeer tabloid's material appeared in The Best of DC #4 (March–April 1980).  A Justice League story by Gerry Conway and Rich Buckler saw print in Justice League of America #210–212 (January 1983–March 1983).

DC Special Series

Other DC treasuries 
 The Amazing World of Superman: Metropolis Edition (1973): Reprints stories from Action Comics #210; Superman #170; and Superboy #153, 161, and 169. New story by writer E. Nelson Bridwell and artists Carmine Infantino, Curt Swan, and Murphy Anderson.
 MGM's Marvelous Wizard of Oz (1975): The first joint publishing venture between Marvel Comics and DC Comics. Comics adaptation of the Metro-Goldwyn-Mayer film by Roy Thomas, John Buscema, and Tony DeZuniga.
 Superman vs. The Amazing Spider-Man (January 1976): The first crossover between DC and Marvel characters, written by Gerry Conway and drawn by Ross Andru and Dick Giordano.
 Superman: Peace on Earth (January 1999): One-shot by writer Paul Dini and artist Alex Ross.
 Superman/Fantastic Four: The Infinite Destruction (April 1999): Intercompany crossover by writer/penciler Dan Jurgens and inker Art Thibert.
 Batman: War on Crime (November 1999): One-shot by writer Paul Dini and artist Alex Ross.
 JLA: Heaven's Ladder (October 2000): One-shot by writer Mark Waid and artists Bryan Hitch and Paul Neary.
 Shazam! Power of Hope (November 2000): One-shot by writer Paul Dini and artist Alex Ross.
 Wonder Woman: Spirit of Truth (November 2001): One-shot by writer Paul Dini and artist Alex Ross.
 JLA: Secret Origins (November 2002): One-shot by writer Paul Dini and artist Alex Ross.
 JLA: Liberty and Justice (November 2003): One-shot by writer Paul Dini and artist Alex Ross.

Collected editions 
 Adventures of Superman: José Luis García-López includes All-New Collectors' Edition #C–54, 360 pages, April 2013, 
 The Amazing World of Superman collects The Amazing World of Superman, 64 pages, April 2021, 
 The Bible collects Limited Collectors' Edition #C–36, 72 pages, May 2012, 
 Shazam! The World's Mightiest Mortal Vol. 2 includes All-New Collectors' Edition #C–58, 328 pages, April 2020, 
 Superboy and the Legion of Super-Heroes Vol. 1 includes All-New Collectors' Edition #C–55, 312 pages, June 2017, 
 Superman vs. Muhammad Ali collects All-New Collectors' Edition #C–56, 80 pages, November 2010,  (treasury size);  (comic book size)
 Superman vs. Shazam! includes All-New Collectors' Edition #C–58, 192 pages, March 2013,  
 Superman vs. Wonder Woman collects All-New Collectors' Edition #C–54, 72 pages, December 2020,  
 Wonder Woman: Spirit of Truth  collects Wonder Woman: Spirit of Truth, 72 pages, March 2020,  
 The World's Greatest Super-Heroes collects Superman: Peace on Earth, Batman: War on Crime, Shazam!: Power of Hope, Wonder Woman: Spirit of Truth, JLA: Secret Origins and JLA: Liberty and Justice, 396 pages, July 2005,

See also 
 Marvel Treasury Edition - a similar series published by Marvel Comics

References

External links 

1972 comics debuts
1974 comics debuts
1978 comics debuts
1978 comics endings
1979 comics endings
Comics anthologies
Comics by Dan Jurgens
Comics by Dennis O'Neil
Comics by Gerry Conway
Comics by Mark Waid
Comics by Neal Adams
Comics by Paul Dini
Comics by Paul Levitz
Comics formats
DC Comics one-shots
DC Comics titles
Defunct American comics